Year 109 (CIX) was a common year starting on Monday (link will display the full calendar) of the Julian calendar. At the time, it was known as the Year of the Consulship of Palma and Tullus (or, less frequently, year 862 Ab urbe condita). The denomination 109 for this year has been used since the early medieval period, when the Anno Domini calendar era became the prevalent method in Europe for naming years.

Events 
 By place 
 Roman Empire 

 The Via Traiana is constructed at the Emperor Trajan's personal expense; the road connects Benevento with Brundisium (Brindisi). 
 The Baths of Trajan, built by the architect Apollodorus of Damascus, are dedicated during the Calends. The thermae are constructed on the platform of the Palace of Nero (Domus Aurea) in Rome.
 Osroes I of Parthia succeeds his brother Pacorus II, and rules over the western Parthian Empire.
 Pliny the Younger is legate to Bithynia.

 By topic 
 Religion 
 The Christian Church proclaims itself to be universal (catholic).

References